Kakaabad (also Romanized as Kākāābād; also known as Kakābād, Kakveh, Kekva, Kekwa, and Kūkāvā) is a village in Soltaniyeh Rural District, Soltaniyeh District, Abhar County, Zanjan Province, Iran. At the 2006 census, its population was 360, in 90 families.

References 

Populated places in Abhar County